Bakurtsikhe — Village in Gurjaani District in the Kakheti region, Georgia.

Bakurtsikhe is located on the right side of the river of Alazani and on both sides of the Chalaubniskhevi river. 440 above the sea level. 8 km from Gurjaani with a population of 2,574 as of 2014.

See also
 Kakheti

References

External links
Maplandia

Sources
 Georgian Soviet Encyclopedia, vol.2, P.162, Tbilisi, 1977.

Populated places in Gurjaani Municipality
Tiflis Governorate